Henri Sauval (5 March 1623 (baptised) – 21 March 1676) was a French historian.

Biography
Sauval was the son of an advocate in the Parlement, he was born in Paris, and baptized on 5 March 1623. He devoted most of his life to researches among the archives of his native city, and in 1656 even obtained a licence to print his Paris ancien et moderne; but on his death (21 March 1676) the whole work was still in manuscript. A long time afterwards it appeared, thanks to his collaborator, Claude Bernard Rousseau, under the title of Histoire et recherches des antiquites de la ville de Paris (1724), but remodelled, with the addition of long and dull dissertations which were not by Sauval.

The work was not without merits, and it was re-issued in 1733 and 1750. The original manuscript first belonged to Montmerqu, and then passed into the possession of Le Roux de Lincy, who prepared an annotated edition; unfortunately this material, together with the original MS., was lost in the incendiary fires which took place under the Paris Commune (1871). There remain, however, Le Roux de Lincy's researches, a series of articles on Sauval which appeared in the Bulletin du bibliophile et du bibliothcaire in 1862, 1866 and 1868.

References

Further reading

vol. 1, vol. 2, and vol 3 at Google Books
vol. 1, vol. 2, and vol. 3 at Gallica 
 "Sauval (Henri), p. 484, at HathiTrust.
Le Roux de Lincy, Bulletin du bibliophile et du bibliothécaire (at HathiTrust), "Henri Sauval, Historien de Paris": Premier article (1862, pp. 1109–1122); Deuxième article (1862, pp. 1173–1192); Troisième article (1866, pp. 223–244); Troisième article (1866, pp. 274–294); "Mémoires critiques sur la vie et les manuscrits de Henri Sauval": Troisième mémoire (1868, pp. 585–608).

17th-century French historians
1623 births
1676 deaths
French male non-fiction writers